Serrodes malgassica is a moth of the family Erebidae. It is found in Madagascar.

References

Moths described in 1972
Serrodes
Moths of Africa